Jacob Alexander "Lecky" Haller (born 2 August 1957 in Glencoe, Maryland) is an American slalom canoeist who competed from the early 1980s to the early 2000s. He won four medals at the ICF Canoe Slalom World Championships with a gold (C2: 1983), two silvers (C2: 1987, C2 team: 1983) and a bronze (C2 team: 1985).

He attended Washington College where he played lacrosse. In 1979 he became an All American honorable mention, and in 1980 he made the first team for All American Lacrosse. Lecky graduated from Washington College in 1981 and until 2012 a 7th grade teacher at French Broad River Academy in Asheville. Now he is a Football, Wrestling, Ski and lacrosse coach at The Asheville School in North Carolina.  He is a 15-time National Champion and a two-time Olympian.

Haller also competed in two Summer Olympics, earning his best finish of fourth in the C2 event in Barcelona in 1992. In 1996 he was ranked Number 1 in the world for men's C2.

In 1988 he won the inaugural overall World Cup title in the C2 category partnering Jamie McEwan, who was his C2 partner until 1992. He was also partnered by his younger brother Fritz Haller and Matt Taylor during his career.

His ex-wife, Cathy Hearn, and his ex-brother-in-law, David Hearn, also competed in canoe slalom for the United States.

World Cup individual podiums

References

 
 Jacob Haller at Olympics at Sports-Reference.com

External links
 
 

1957 births
American male canoeists
Canoeists at the 1992 Summer Olympics
Canoeists at the 2000 Summer Olympics
Living people
Olympic canoeists of the United States
Medalists at the ICF Canoe Slalom World Championships
Sportspeople from Baltimore County, Maryland